Reinecker is a surname. Notable people with the surname include: 

Herbert Reinecker (1914–2007), German novelist, dramatist, and screenwriter
Wally Reinecker (1890–1957), American baseball player

See also
Reinecke